= Hancockius augur =

Scientific classification
- Kingdom: Animalia
- Phylum: Arthropoda
- Class: Insecta
- Order: Diptera
- Family: Tephritidae
- Genus: Hancockius
- Species: H. augur

Binomial name
- Hancockius augur (Frauenfeld, 1857)

Species of fly

Hancockius augur is a species of fly in the genus Hancockius of the family Tephritidae.
